Dolichoderus pastorulus is a species of ant in the genus Dolichoderus. Described by Dill in 2002, the species is endemic to Borneo.

References

Dolichoderus
Hymenoptera of Asia
Insects of Borneo
Insects described in 2002